Sears, Roebuck and Company Warehouse Building, also known as Missouri Poster and Sign Company, Inc. and Bellas Hess Antique Mall, is a historic warehouse building located at North Kansas City, Missouri.  It was built in 1912–1923, and is a nine-story building built as a merchandise warehouse for Sears.  The building features Late Gothic Revival and Chicago school style design elements. It has since been adaptively reused as apartments and is now known as Park Lofts.

It was listed on the National Register of Historic Places in 1997.

References

Commercial buildings on the National Register of Historic Places in Missouri
Gothic Revival architecture in Missouri
Commercial buildings completed in 1913
Buildings and structures in Clay County, Missouri
National Register of Historic Places in Kansas City, Missouri
Sears Holdings buildings and structures
Chicago school architecture in Missouri